The 1973 Ohio State Buckeyes football team represented the Ohio State University in the 1973 Big Ten Conference football season. The Buckeyes compiled a 10–0–1 record, including the 1974 Rose Bowl in Pasadena, California, where they won, 42–21, against the USC Trojans. The Ohio State Buckeyes were named national champion by the National Championship Foundation, Poling System, David Rothman (statistician) and the Sagarin Ratings, but this championship is not claimed by Ohio State.

Schedule

Personnel

Game summaries

Minnesota

TCU

Cornelius Greene 15 Rush, 113 Yds
Champ Henson tore a knee ligament during the game

Washington State

at Wisconsin

at Indiana

Bruce Elia 24 rushes, 123 yards

Northwestern

at Illinois

Michigan State

Iowa

at Michigan

Cornelius Greene played with injured thumb (did not attempt a pass)

Rose Bowl (vs. USC)

MVP - Cornelius Greene 174 yards total offense, rush TD

1974 NFL draftees

References

Ohio State
Ohio State Buckeyes football seasons
Big Ten Conference football champion seasons
Rose Bowl champion seasons
College football undefeated seasons
Ohio State Buckeyes football